Robert Charles Appleby (born 10 October 1913 in Saskatchewan, Canada - died 8 October 1946) was a speedway rider.

Appleby was a member of the Hackney Wick Wolves team that won the National League Division II Championship in 1938.

After the end of World War II Appleby returned to the UK and was signed by the Birmingham Brummies. He was enjoying a steady season but on 7 October he was involved in a crash at Brough Park.

During the Northern League fixture on 7 October, Appleby crashed in an effort to avoid a fallen rider in front. Appleby swerved and hit the machine instead. He was thrown into the air and suffered a fractured skull. He was taken to Newcastle Infirmary but died during the early hours of 8 October.

References 

Canadian speedway riders
1913 births
1946 deaths
Hackney Wick Wolves riders
Birmingham Brummies riders
Motorcycle racers who died while racing
Sportspeople from Saskatchewan
Sport deaths in Canada